Kanchov Peak is the rocky peak rising to 1200 m on the west coast of Pernik Peninsula, Loubet Coast in Graham Land, Antarctica. The feature has steep and partly ice-free slopes, surmounting Lallemand Fjord to the west, Salmon Cove to the north, and Field Glacier to the southeast and south.

The peak is named after the Bulgarian geographer, ethnographer and historian Vasil Kanchov (1862–1902).

Location
British mapping in 1978.

Maps
 Antarctic Digital Database (ADD). Scale 1:250000 topographic map of Antarctica. Scientific Committee on Antarctic Research (SCAR). Since 1993, regularly upgraded and updated.
British Antarctic Territory. Scale 1:200000 topographic map. DOS 610 Series, Sheet W 67 66. Directorate of Overseas Surveys, Tolworth, UK, 1978.

References
 Bulgarian Antarctic Gazetteer. Antarctic Place-names Commission. (details in Bulgarian, basic data in English)
Kanchov Peak. SCAR Composite Antarctic Gazetteer.

External links
 Kanchov Peak. Copernix satellite image

Mountains of Graham Land
Bulgaria and the Antarctic
Loubet Coast